Paratherina cyanea is a species of fish in the subfamily Telmatherininae, part of the rainbowfish family Melanotaeniidae. It is endemic to Indonesia where it occurs in Lakes Towuti and Mahalona on the island of Sulawesi.

References

cyanea
Taxonomy articles created by Polbot
Fish described in 1935